The Skagit  (″People Who Hide″ or ″People Who Run and Hide Upriver [the Skagit River]″) refers to either of two modern-day tribes of Lushootseed-speaking Native American people living in the state of Washington: the Upper Skagit tribe, and the Lower Skagit band of the Swinomish tribe.

The Upper Skagit and Lower Skagit both speak subdialects of Northern Lushootseed. The Upper Skagit speak Skagit. , there were an estimated 100 speakers of Skagit. The Lower Skagit speak Swinomish, the subdialect of the Swinomish people.

Traditionally, Skagit referred only to the Lower Skagit on Whidbey Island. However, after colonization, the word Skagit was used to refer to both groups. 

The Skagit River, Skagit Bay, and Skagit County all derive their names from the Skagit peoples.

References

External links 
OLAC resources in and about the Skagit language

Native American tribes in Washington (state)
Lushootseed language